is a military air base located in Yakumo, Futami District, Hokkaido Prefecture, Japan.

References

Hokkaido
Japan Air Self-Defense Force bases
Military installations established in 1943
Yakumo, Hokkaido